= Gerhard Nehls =

Christian missionary

Gerhard Nehls (29 April 1928 - 3 May 2025), was a Christian missionary and author, born in Germany near Magdeburg. As a teenager during World War II, he fought on the side of Nazi Germany in the Air Defense against Allied attacks, and after the war committing "small acts of Resistance" against the Soviet allied government in East German, for which he was imprisoned in forced labour camps from August 1945 to January 1950. After escaping to West Berlin he moved to South Africa where in March 1958 he and his wife converted to Christianity and "decided to surrender their lives to Christ". He became a Christian missionary, preaching in Rhodesia, the Belgian Congo, and South Africa. In 1975, Gerhard moved to Cape Town to focus on converting Muslims to Christianity and began to study Islam and the Quran. He was married with five children and many grandchildren.

The WorldCat international union catalog lists "60 works in 120 publications in 4 languages and 328 library holdings" by Nehls, with ten books as "the most widely held" in libraries. Goodreads lists fourteen of his books.
